William Glenn Lewis (born July 12, 1963) is a former American football center.  He played college for Nebraska and professionally in the National Football League (NFL) for the Los Angeles Raiders (1986–1989), the Phoenix Cardinals (1990–1992), and the New England Patriots (1993).

His son, Alex Lewis, later also played at Nebraska before being drafted by the Baltimore Ravens in the 2016 NFL Draft.

References

1963 births
Living people
American football centers
Los Angeles Raiders players
Nebraska Cornhuskers football players
New England Patriots players
Phoenix Cardinals players
Sportspeople from Sioux City, Iowa
Players of American football from Iowa